Number pooling is a method of reallocating telephony numbering space in the North American Numbering Plan, primarily in growth areas in the United States.

Instead of allocating blocks of ten thousand numbers to each carrier in each community, a block of ten thousand numbers is assigned to an individual geographic rate center. That block is then split into ten blocks of a thousand numbers each, which can be separately assigned to competitive local exchange carriers by a number pooling administrator. This reduces the quantity of wasted numbers in markets which have been fragmented between multiple carriers.

History
The North American Numbering Plan is based on fixed-length telephone numbers; when area codes (1947) and direct distance dialling (1951) were first introduced, North American numbers were gradually extended to a fixed length in the format 1 + three-digit area code + three-digit exchange prefix + four-digit subscriber number. Each central office (CO)  code (exchange prefix) contained 10,000 possible local numbers—enough for a village or small town telephone exchange. A mid-size city would have multiple exchanges with multiple CO codes assigned to each.

North American mobile telephones, from their introduction in 1983, have used local numbers from the same geographic area codes as wireline services. Unlike the system in nations where mobiles have their own special area code, the recipient of a mobile call in the US or Canada pays the airtime charges.

Background
In most areas, one carrier held a monopoly on local service. The landline telephone system was originally constructed in an era before transistorisation, remote concentrators or cabinetisation. Individual lines from subscribers ran not to a remote concentrator but directly to the nearest village community dial office, to be terminated at an automated mechanical switch or manual exchange. To keep subscriber loop wiring requirements manageable, local exchanges were built in each tiny hamlet. Rural subscribers often made do with party line service. Each village was a separate rate center for long-distance calls and each had its own block of ten thousand numbers (the largest that reasonably could fit on a small-town manual cord switchboard with a jack and indicator for each line). In most small villages, many of these numbers would remain unused. In large cities, multiple exchanges were created to cover individual districts or neighbourhoods; each had its own series of distinctive prefixes, and multiple blocks of ten thousand numbers each. The first few digits of a number uniquely identified a village, a town or a neighbourhood of a big city.

Widespread introduction of automated mobile phone service in 1983 created two competing carriers in each city. Additional mobile carriers entered the market to provide digital service (such as GSM, introduced in 1991). In 1985, competitive access providers (CAPs) began to offer private line and special access services; originally based on PBX standards such as direct inward dial, these evolved into full competitive local exchange carriers (CLEC). The Telecommunications Act of 1996 required incumbent telephone companies to interconnect with the new entrants.

Each carrier was assigned one or more CO code prefixes (10,000 numbers each) for each individual rate center and each wire center in its coverage area.

Deployment of cable modems and voice over IP in the 1990s further blurred the boundaries between telcos and cable television providers. Suddenly, every broadband Internet provider could become a telephone company, with telephony merely being one more application running over the packet-switched network. There was no requirement that the Internet to telephony gateway be operated by a facilities-based telco or cable company; anyone could buy a large block of numbers from a CLEC, deploy a server to feed the calls to broadband Internet and offer telephone service.

With the advent of competition, each individual carrier required its own prefixes in each rate center in each municipality, depleting available prefixes within high-growth and high-competition areas. (These were already under pressure due to increased use of direct inward dial PBX extensions, mobile telephones, pagers, fax machines and dial-up modems at the time.) Many of these new prefixes were largely empty. This led to a rapid increase in the introduction of new area codes.

By 1995, the NANPA was forced to change the format rules to increase the number of valid area codes. Previously, all area codes had 0 or 1 as their second (middle) digit; the rule change allowed any digit except 9 as the second digit. This broke 1 + 7 digit long-distance calling within the same area code and required the leading 1- be dialed on toll calls in cities where it had formerly been optional. The change also caused problems for some office private branch exchange systems, creating an opportunity readily exploited by vendors to sell businesses costly new equipment or hosted Centrex service. Widescale introduction of new area codes created confusion as consumers were often unaware which were domestic-rate calls and which were premium calls to Caribbean or foreign numbers within the NANP.

The new area codes brought an initial flood of split plans which changed millions of existing numbers. Businesses in the newly created area codes (such as area code 520 in Arizona) found many clients attempting to call them were instead repeatedly reaching a wrong number due to incompatible or misconfigured switching equipment at call origin which could not handle the new codes.

The first deployment of an overlay plan with forced ten-digit dialing for local calls on June 1, 1997, in Maryland's area code 301, also led to consumer confusion as the same point could now have multiple area codes.

Testing and deployment 
Public resistance to the introduction of new area codes, whether through overlay plans (which allowed customers to keep their existing numbers, but broke seven-digit local calling) or through split plans (where the area code of existing numbers was changed), prompted the FCC and state telecommunication commissions to introduce and encourage the allocation of number space in smaller blocks of 1,000 numbers, with each block consisting of a prefix and the first digit after the prefix.

These developments largely coincided with the deployment of local number portability (LNP), a scheme which allowed subscribers to keep their existing numbers when switching to a different provider in the same community.

The original LNP database contract was granted in 1996. The number pooling scheme relies on LNP as it relies on carriers to return blocks of mostly unused numbers. The thousand-number blocks being returned to the pool may be "contaminated" with up to a hundred working numbers which must be ported to a block which the carrier intends to keep.

In 1998, the director of the North American Numbering Plan Administration had estimated the NANP would have run out of area codes for 10-digit phone numbers by 2025 at then-current rates of depletion.

An initial number pooling trial was conducted in area code 847 in Illinois in April 1998. Nortel had implemented support for thousands-level routing of calls in its equipment by 1999. Pooling trials were conducted in 34 area codes across a dozen US states between 1997–2000.

The 847 area code, located northwest of Chicago, had already been subjected to multiple area code splits and a proposed overlay area code 224 with 11-digit local calling was drawing public backlash; inefficient allocation meant that some providers had been holding 10,000 number blocks in rate centers where they had few clients or even no clients. A carrier with a few thousand clients scattered across multiple rate centers often had 50,000 allocated numbers. The state's telecommunications regulator, the Illinois Commerce Commission, at the urging of consumer advocates, pushed back against industry and FCC demands for a distributed overlay on 1-847 from 1999 to 2001 as half of the existing 1-847 numbers were not in use. The Citizens Utility Board, a Chicago-based consumer group, attempted to litigate against an arbitrary FCC requirement that calls within the same area code be dialed with the area code when 224 was introduced in 2002, but to no avail. A similar fight by New York state's Public Service Commission to maintain seven-digit dialing within the same area code (including calls from 212 to 212) was also moot.

An attempt by the United States Telecom Association, a trade group of local phone companies, to propose mandatory 10-digit dialing nationwide was rejected by the FCC in 2000. The FCC instead adopted many aspects of the Illinois Commerce Commission number pooling trial, including a requirement that telcos actually use 60% percent of their allocations (increased to 75% after three years) before requesting more phone numbers, allocation of new numbers to phone companies in blocks of 1,000 and a requirement that phone companies return unused numbers to a pool.

Number pooling was implemented in various areas (including Spokane in January 2002) with national rollout in the 100 largest metropolitan statistical areas on March 15, 2002.

While mandatory number pooling requirements originally existed only in the top 100 MSA's, the National Association of Regulatory Commissioners (NARUC) petitioned the FCC in 2006 to extend them to rural states to cope with demand for numbers for VoIP. All US states have implemented their own regulations requiring that carriers implement number pooling. By 2013, even sparsely populated Montana was using number pooling in order to extend the useful life of area code 406, the one area code in the state.

In some areas, decreased code demand and conservation efforts have allowed the introduction of proposed new area codes to be delayed. Area code 564, proposed to overlay the portion of western Washington State currently in area codes 206, 253, 360, and 425 was delayed in 2001 as codes were reclaimed and numbers pooled; it was later reinstated, initially affecting area code 360 and expanding to the other mentioned area codes as needed, with 10-digit dialing set to become mandatory by September 30, 2017. A proposed area code 445 overlaying Philadelphia was scrapped in 2003; it was later reinstated, and is set to go into effect on March 3, 2018.  An area code 582 intended to split Pennsylvania's existing area code 814 was abandoned in 2012.

Number pooling remains available to carriers on an optional basis in many US markets in which it is not yet mandatory.

Number pooling at the thousands-block level is just one of several approaches which can be used to conserve numbering resources. Other options include consolidating multiple rate centers into one (as much of the problem is caused by carriers needlessly requesting a prefix in each rate center), allowing carriers to use a single prefix in each LATA or local interconnect region to port existing numbers from all rate centers in that area, or even placing all the unused numbers in one rate center into a single available pool from which carriers port only what they need (as already exists for toll-free telephone numbers with the SMS/800 database and RespOrg structure). A block of 1,000 numbers per carrier, like the earlier allocation of 10,000 numbers per carrier in each rate center, is arbitrary. Local number portability could allow numbers to be assigned to carriers one at a time.

Implementation
In areas which were running short of numbers, blocks of 10,000 numbers would be assigned to an individual rate center; from there, it would be split into smaller blocks of 1,000 numbers each, for assignment to individual providers by a number pooling administrator.

According to 47 CFR 52.20, a US federal regulation administered by the Federal Communications Commission:
 Thousands-block number pooling is a process by which the 10,000 numbers in a central office code (NXX) are separated into ten sequential blocks of 1,000 numbers each (thousands-blocks), and allocated separately within a rate center.
 In area codes where service providers are required to participate in thousands-block number pooling, the carrier is to return any blocks of 1,000 numbers which are more than 90% empty; an exemption applies for one block per rate center which the carrier must keep as an initial block or footprint block.
 The Pooling Administrator, a neutral third party, maintains no more than a six-month inventory of telephone numbers in each thousands-block number pool.

The default National Number Pool Administration in the United States is Somos, the North American Numbering Plan Administrator. Canada has no number pooling.

Local exchange routing databases now include a "block ID" to indicate the ownership of the specific sub-blocks within a prefix.

An example of a small hamlet with number pooling is La Fargeville, New York (population 600), in the 315/680 area codes. Once a small incorporated village built around a saw mill, its town hall closed in 1922. The La Fargeville rate center's local calling area is the same as neighboring Clayton, New York, yet there is a separate Verizon landline exchange for each village — likely as a historical artifact of an earlier era when telcos built many small, local stations. While both villages are served by separate, unattended remote switching centers controlled from Watertown, Verizon nominally has a half-dozen competitors offering local numbers in tiny La Fargeville:

Ten thousand numbers for an unincorporated hamlet of 600 people is inefficient, but the actual result, were number pooling not available, would be seven times worse; each telephone company would be assigned an entire 10,000-number telephone exchange code for a total of 70,000 numbers. Multiply this by every tiny village in the region (1-315 covers a wide area, including Utica, Syracuse, Watertown, and Massena) and the entire area code would be quickly depleted.

See also
Numbering plan area

References

Telephone numbers
North American Numbering Plan